Michael Scott Kennedy (born February 26, 1959) is a former American football defensive back. He played for the Buffalo Bills in 1983 and for the Houston Oilers in 1984.

References

1959 births
Living people
American football defensive backs
Toledo Rockets football players
Buffalo Bills players
Houston Oilers players